In inorganic chemistry, Hofmann clathrates refers to materials with the formula Ni(CN)2(NH3)(C6H6).  These materials are a type of coordination polymer.  They have attracted attention because they can be used to separate xylenes. On a conceptual level, Hofmann clathrates can be viewed as forerunners to metal-organic frameworks (MOFs).

Structures

The empirical formula Ni(CN)2(NH3)(C6H6) reflects the presence of two types of nickel(II) centers, one of which is the square-planar tetracyanonickelate, [Ni(CN)4]2-.  The second kind of nickel site consists of [Ni(NH3)2]2+ groups that are connected to the Ni-CN nitrogens. Thus cyanide serves as a bridging ligand.  The linking of the [Ni(CN)4]2- and trans-[Ni(NH3)2]2+ subunits results in a sheet-like polymer.  Voids between these sheets, defined by the ammonia ligands, are occupied by benzene molecules.

Variations
Many variations of Hofmann clathrates have been reported.  The ammonia ligands can be replaced by diamines.  Tetracyanonickelate can be replaced by tetracyanopalladate.  A wide range of arenes can occupy the benzene site.

References

Nickel complexes
Cyano complexes
Cyanometallates